The Municipality of Podlehnik is a municipality in Slovenia. It lies in the traditional region of Styria in northeastern Slovenia and belongs to the Drava Statistical Region. The municipality borders on the municipalities of Videm and Žetale, and Croatia. The seat of the municipality is the town of Podlehnik. The municipality was established in 1999.

Settlements
In addition to the municipal seat of Podlehnik, the municipality also includes the following settlements:

 Dežno pri Podlehniku
 Gorca
 Jablovec
 Kozminci
 Ložina
 Rodni Vrh
 Sedlašek
 Spodnje Gruškovje
 Stanošina
 Strajna
 Zakl
 Zgornje Gruškovje

References

External links
 
 Municipality of Podlehnik on Geopedia
 Podlehnik municipal site

1999 establishments in Slovenia
Apace